Leger is a newer neighbourhood in the Terwillegar Heights area of south west Edmonton, Alberta, Canada.

According to the 2005 municipal census, approximately four out of five homes (82%) are single-family dwellings.  Another 14% are duplexes and 4% are row houses.  Substantially all (97%) of residences are owner-occupied.

The neighbourhood is bounded on the south by 23 Avenue, on the west by Terwillegar Drive, on the east by Rabbit Hill Road, and on the north by a utility corridor located just north of 29 Avenue.

Demographics 

Recreation 

The Terwillegar Community Recreation Centre is located in the neighbourhood. The facility has an aquatic centre, a fitness centre and track, a flexi-hall with three full size gymnasiums, an arena with four NHL size ice sheets, a children's wing, and commercial spaces.

Education 
There is a kindergarten to junior high (K-9) school in the neighbourhood, Archbishop Joseph MacNeil School, operated by the Edmonton Catholic School System. Also a Senior High (10-12), Lillian Osborne has been built in the area by the Edmonton Public Schools

A catholic high school, Mother Margaret Mary (10-12), was to be complete early 2011, and opened its doors in 2012.

Leger Transit Centre 

The Leger Transit Centre, opened on April 26, 2009, is located along Leger Road and 23 Avenue next to the Terwillegar Recreation Centre and Lillian Osborne High School. This transit centre has no park & ride or public washrooms but does have a large shelter, a drop off area and vending machines.

The following bus routes serve the transit centre:

Surrounding neighbourhoods

See also 
 Edmonton Transit Service

References

External links 
 Leger Neighbourhood Profile

Neighbourhoods in Edmonton
Edmonton Transit Service transit centres